James Drew Bush III (born February 13, 1955) is a Miami, Florida teacher and Democratic politician who served as the representative for District 109 of the  Florida House of Representatives. He previously represented the same district from 1992 to 2000 and from 2008 to 2010.

Representative Bush was born in  Panama City, Florida on February 13, 1955. His wife, Bernadine Bush is from Buffalo, New York. He graduated from Miami Northwestern Senior High School in 1974. Bush earned his Bachelor of Science degree from Bethune-Cookman College in 1979 and his Master of Science in Educational Administration and Supervision from Nova Southeastern University in 1984. He made an unsuccessful bid for Florida Commissioner of Education in 2000. In 2010, he ran for Congress in the 17th District, losing to state senator Frederica Wilson. In 2004, he earned his D.Min-Christian Ed. at Smith Chapel Bible College. Since returning to the legislature, Bush garnered a conservative record; voting for controversial bills put forward by Ron DeSantis namely the "Don't Say Gay" bill. Earning the ire of many in Tallahassee and the Democratic party's liberal and progressive wings, Bush lost reelection in 2022 to Ashley Gantt and since neither candidate faces a general election opponent the primary was tantamount to victory.

See also
United States House of Representatives elections in Florida, 2010#District 17

References

External links
 Representative James Bush III official Florida House of Representatives site
 

Bethune–Cookman University alumni
Nova Southeastern University alumni
Democratic Party members of the Florida House of Representatives
1955 births
Living people
People from Panama City, Florida
21st-century American politicians
21st-century African-American politicians
20th-century African-American people